The 37th edition of the annual Clásico RCN was held from March 15 to March 24, 1997, in Colombia. The stage race had an UCI rate of 2.4. RCN stands for "Radio Cadena Nacional". There were a total number of 90 competitors from 12 teams, with 71 riders actually finishing the stage race.

Stages

1997-03-15: Tocancipá — Villa de Leyva (149 km)

1997-03-16: Villa de Leyva — Monguí (128 km)

1997-03-17: Duitama — Barbosa (121 km)

1997-03-18: Barbosa — Piedecuesta (203 km)

1997-03-19: Bucaramanga — Barrancabermeja (161 km)

1997-03-20: Barrancabermeja — Puerto Boyacá (230 km)

1997-03-21: Doradal — Guatapé (175 km)

1997-03-22: Rionegro — Puerto Salgar (180 km)

1997-03-23: Circuito Parque Simón Bolivar, Bogotá (100 km)

1997-03-23: Bogotá — Bogotá (35 km)

Final classification

See also 
 1997 Vuelta a Colombia

References 
 cyclingnews
 Historia
 memoire-du-cyclisme

Clásico RCN
Clasico RCN
Clasico RCN